Jay Turner may refer to:

Jay Turner (American football), American football running back
Jay Turner (cinematographer), American cinematographer
Jay Turner (Home and Away)